Emerson School District or Emerson Public Schools was a school district headquartered in Emerson, Arkansas. It operated Emerson Elementary School, Emerson Middle School, and Emerson High School.

On July 1, 2004, it consolidated with the Taylor School District to form the Emerson-Taylor School District (now the Emerson-Taylor-Bradley School District).

References

Further reading
Map of the Emerson district:
 Map of Arkansas School Districts pre-July 1, 2004
  (Download)

External links
 

Education in Columbia County, Arkansas
Defunct school districts in Arkansas
2004 disestablishments in Arkansas
School districts disestablished in 2004